George Henry Poulton (23 April 1929, - 3 December 2010) was an English professional footballer of the 1950s. He played for Gillingham and Leyton Orient and in total made 66 appearances in The Football League, scoring 25 goals.

References

1929 births
2010 deaths
English footballers
Gillingham F.C. players
Leyton Orient F.C. players
Ebbsfleet United F.C. players
Association football midfielders